Keitel is a German surname.  Notable people with the surname include:

 Wilhelm Keitel (1882–1946), Field Marshal of Nazi Germany, executed for war crimes
 Karl-Heinz Keitel (born 1914), Waffen-SS Sturmbannführer and son of Wilhelm Keitel
 Harvey Keitel (born 1939), American actor
 Stella Keitel (born 1985), American actress
 Christoph Helmut Keitel (born 1965), German physicist
 Sebastián Keitel (born 1973), Chilean sprinter
 Jesse James Keitel (born 1993), American actress
 Yannik Keitel (born 2000), German footballer

German-language surnames